Darko Vukašinović (born 5 March 1985 in Titograd, now Podgorica) is a Montenegrin retired football defender.

Club career
Prior to his transfer to Slavia Sofia, he played for FK Budućnost Podgorica and FK Zeta.  He moved to Slavia on a free transfer, as he had a contract with the FK Zeta, helping them to win the league.

International career
He was part of the Serbia and Montenegro team that played at the 2002 UEFA European Under-17 Football Championship.

Notes

1985 births
Living people
Footballers from Podgorica
Association football defenders
Serbia and Montenegro footballers
Montenegrin footballers
FK Budućnost Podgorica players
FK Zeta players
PFC Slavia Sofia players
FK Lovćen players
First League of Serbia and Montenegro players
Montenegrin First League players
First Professional Football League (Bulgaria) players
Montenegrin expatriate footballers
Expatriate footballers in Bulgaria
Montenegrin expatriate sportspeople in Bulgaria